The Slovenian Armed Forces or Slovenian Army (SAF; ; [SV]) are the armed forces of Slovenia. Since 2003, it is organized as a fully professional standing army. The Commander-in-Chief of the SAF is the President of the Republic of Slovenia, while operational command is in the domain of the Chief of the General Staff of the Slovenian Armed Forces.

History

20th century

Following the disintegration of the Austrian-Hungarian Empire at the end of World War I, the Duchy of Styria was divided between the newly established states of German Austria and the State of Slovenes, Croats and Serbs. Rudolf Maister, a Slovene major of the former Austro-Hungarian Army, liberated the town of Maribor in November 1918 and claimed it for the State of Slovenes, Croats and Serbs. After a short fight with German Austrian provisional units, the current border was established, which mostly followed the ethnic-linguistic division between Slovenes and ethnic Germans in Styria.

The current Slovenian Armed Forces are descended from the Slovenian Territorial Defence (Teritorialna Obramba Republike Slovenije; or Slovene TO), formed in 1991 by fusion of Territorial Defence (formed in 1968 as a paramilitary complement to the regular army of the former Yugoslav within the territory of Slovenia) with secret alternative command structure, known as the Manoeuvre Structures of National Protection (Manevrska struktura narodne zaščite, or MSNZ), which was an existing but antiquated institution, (unique to Slovenia), intended to enable the republic to form an ad hoc defence structure, akin to a National Guard. It was of negligible importance prior to 1990, with antiquated weapons and few members.

When Slovenia declared independence at the onset of the Yugoslav Wars in 1991, the Slovenian Territorial Defence and the Slovenian police comprised the majority of forces engaging the Yugoslav People's Army during the Ten-Day War.  The Slovenian Armed Forces were formally established in 1993 as a reorganization of the Slovenia Territorial Defence Force.

Republic of Slovenia

After 1993, the Slovenian Armed Forces had relied on mandatory military service, with conscripts receiving 6–7 months of training. In 2003, the Slovenian Government abolished conscription and as of July 2004, the Slovenian Armed Forces had been almost completely reorganised into a professional army now based on volunteers. Currently there are approximately 7,300 active troops and approximately 1,500 in reserve, reduced from 55,000 personnel during conscription.

A major reorganization of the Slovenian Armed Forces is currently underway with a goal making them more effective and cheaper. More than half of all commands have been disbanded which has made commanding the subordinated units easier and faster. Soldiers are to be located nearer to their homes in order to minimize travel costs. Since the Slovenian Armed Forces do not have enough modern armored vehicles to maintain three motorized battalions fulfilled at every time, one Wheeled Combat Vehicles Company and one Tank Company have been organized within the Logistics brigade, which now lends vehicles to any of four newly formed infantry regiments, regarding to the regiments' needs. Reorganization also transformed 72nd Brigade from a support unit to a combat unit and thus equaled it with the 1st Brigade. Both brigades were added support elements, such as Air Defense, Artillery, Intelligence, etc. The operational units now consist of Special Operations Unit, Naval Division, an Aviation Regiment and three brigades, the 1st (responsible for western Slovenia), 72nd (responsible for eastern Slovenia) and Logistics Brigade.

NATO membership (from 2004)

As part of the former Socialist Federal Republic of Yugoslavia, Slovenia was never a member of the Warsaw Pact. Today, the foreign policy priority of NATO membership drives Slovenia's defense reorganization. Once many countries lifted the arms embargo on Slovenia in 1996, the country embarked on a military procurement program to bolster its status as a NATO candidate and to aid its transformation into a mobile force. Active in the SFOR deployment in Bosnia and Herzegovina, Slovenia is also a charter member of Partnership for Peace and a regular participant in PfP exercises. The United States provides bilateral military assistance to Slovenia, including through the International Military Education and Training (IMET) program, the State Partnership Program (aligned with Colorado), and the EUCOM Joint Contact Team Program.

Slovenia formally joined NATO in March 2004. The transition of its armed forces from a primarily conscript-based territorial defense organization to a professional force structure has the ultimate goal of creating NATO-interoperable combat units able to operate on an even par with units from other NATO armies. Implementation of interoperability objectives as determined by the Planning and Review Process (PARP) and the Individual Partnership Program (IPP) as part of Slovenia's PfP participation proceeds. Slovenia's elite units already train with and are integrated into international units including NATO members—for example as part of SFOR and on Cyprus. Its elite mountain troops will be assigned to the Multinational Land Force peacekeeping battalion with Italy, Hungary, and Croatia. Slovenia hosted its first PfP exercise in 1998--"Cooperative Adventure Exchange"—a multinational disaster-preparedness command post exercise involving almost 6,000 troops from 19 NATO and PfP member nations.

As of 2011 Slovenian soldiers were a part of international forces serving in Bosnia and Herzegovina, Kosovo, Afghanistan, Iraq, Chad, and Lebanon.

Slovenia hosts Multinational Centre of Excellence for Mountain Warfare (MN COEMW), one of NATO Centres of Excellence, located in Bohinjska Bela, Slovenia. It is "responsible for training individuals and units for operation in the mountains and other terrains difficult to pass".

Organization

The Slovenian Armed Forces are organized as single-branch armed forces with the army as their primary component. The personnel is divided into three categories:
 professional soldiers (full-time soldiers)
 contract reserve soldiers (serve up to 30 days per year)
 voluntary recruits (basic training)

Order of Battle 

 General Staff of the Slovenian Armed Forces, in Ljubljana
 Military Orchestra
 Protocol Unit
 Joint Operations Center
 Situation Monitoring Section
 Movement Coordination Section
 Operations Management Section
 Support Branch
 Force Command, in Vrhnika
 Forces Command Support Unit, in Vrhnika
 Military Police Unit
 Electronic Warfare Unit
 Communication and Information Systems Unit
 Combined Arms Training Center
 1st Brigade, in Ljubljana
 10th Infantry Regiment, in Ljubljana
 4x Infantry Companies
 Headquarters and Logistic Company
 132nd (Mountain) Infantry Regiment, in Bohinjska Bela
 4x Mountain Infantry Companies
 Headquarters and Logistic Company
 Multinational Centre of Excellence for Mountain Warfare
 Territorial Regiment, in Nova Gorica
 Combat Support Battalion, in Ljubljana
 Intelligence and Reconnaissance Company
 Anti-Tank Company, with Spike MR/LR ATGMs
 Fire Support Battery, with TN90 155mm towed howitzers and MN9 120mm mortars
 Light Air Defense Missile Battery, with Giraffe radar and Igla-2 MANPADS
 Engineer Company
 Nuclear, Biological, Chemical Defense Company
 Signals Company
 Military Police Company
 72nd Brigade, in Maribor
 20th Infantry Regiment, in Celje
 4x Infantry Companies
 Headquarters and Logistic Company
 74th Infantry Regiment, in Maribor
 4x Infantry Companies
 Headquarters and Logistic Company
 Territorial Regiment, in Novo Mesto
 Combat Support Battalion, in Murska Sobota
 Intelligence and Reconnaissance Company
 Anti-Tank Company, with Spike MR/LR ATGMs
 Fire Support Battery, with TN90 155mm towed howitzers and MN9 120mm mortars
 Light Air Defense Missile Battery, with Giraffe radar and Igla-2 MANPADS
 Engineer Company
 Nuclear, Biological, Chemical Defense Company
 Signals Company
 Military Police Company
 Logistic Brigade, in Kranj
 157th Logistics Regiment, in Šentvid
 1st Vehicle Maintenance Company
 2nd Vehicle Maintenance Company
 3rd Weapons Maintenance Company
 5th Wheeled Combat Vehicles Company
 45th Tracked Combat Vehicles Center
 Infrastructure Maintenance
 Spare Parts Storage and Distribution Unit
 670th Logistics Regiment, in Slovenska Bistrica
 Service Company
 Supply Company
 1st Transport Company
 2nd Transport Company
 Fixed Supply Company
 Driving School
 Fuel Distribution
 Uniforms and Equipment Distribution
 Medical Unit, in Šentvid
 Medical Logistic Center
 Medical Center
 Medical Company West
 Medical Company East
 Medical Hospital – Role 2 Military Treatment Facility
 Veterinary Service
 Laboratory for Nuclear, radiological, chemical and biological defense
 15th Wing, at Cerklje ob Krki Air Base
 16th Airspace Control and Reporting Centre, in Zgornji Brnik
 Air Space Surveillance and Control Center, reports to NATO's Integrated Air Defense System CAOC Torrejón, in Spain
 1st Radar Station, in Vrhnika, with Ground Master 403
 2nd Radar Station, in Hočko Pohorje, with Ground Master 403
 Mobile Radar Company, in Soteska
 Logistic Company
 107th Air Base, at Cerklje ob Krki Air Base
 Cerklje ob Krki Air Base Support Company
 151st Helicopter Squadron, at Cerklje ob Krki Air Base
 Bell 412 Helicopter Section
 AS532 AL Cougar Helicopter Section
 Aero-technical Company
 152nd Aircraft Squadron, at Cerklje ob Krki Air Base
 1st PC-9M Hudournik Fighter Planes Section
 2nd PC-9M Hudournik Fighter Planes Section
 Air Transport Section, with PC-6 Porter and Falcon 2000 EX
 Aero-technical Company
 153rd Aircraft Maintenance Squadron, at Cerklje ob Krki Air Base
 Aeronautical-technical Engineering
 Aircraft Maintenance Company
 Helicopter Maintenance Company
 Flight School, at Cerklje ob Krki Air Base
 1st Zlín Z-242 Training Planes Section
 2nd Zlín Z-242 Training Planes Section
 Bell 206 Training Helicopter Section
 Aero-technical Company
 430th Naval Division, in Ankaran
 Naval Operations Center
 Multirole Vessels Detachment
 Special Underwater Operations Detachment
 Explosive Ordnance Disposal Platoon
 Special Operations Unit, in Kočevska Reka
 Special Operations Company
 Combat Service Support Company 
 Special Operations Training Center
 Specialized Unit of the Military Police, in Ljubljana
 "FIST" Platoon – Specialized Unit for Special Tactics
 EOD Detachment
 Investigations Detachment
 Military Education Center, in Maribor
 Command and Staff School, in Maribor
 Officer School, in Maribor
 Non-Commissioned Officer School, in Maribor
 Foreign Languages School, in Begunje na Gorenjskem
 Basic Military Skills Center, in Vipava
 Library, Information and Publishing Center, in Ljubljana
 E-Learning Section, in Maribor
 Military Museum of the Slovenian Armed Forces, in Maribor
 Slovenian Army Sport Unit

Military bases

Military airports 
The Slovenian army currently maintains one military airport Cerklje ob Krki near town of Brežice.
The airport's official name is Cerklje ob Krki Airbase.

The others that are partially military are:
 Ljubljana Airbase shares the airport with Ljubljana International Airport. One helicopter Bell 412 is stationed there for mountain rescue.

International cooperation
Slovenia is part of the United Nations, NATO and the European Union, and supports the efforts of these organisations in peacekeeping operations and humanitarian activities. The Slovenian Armed Forces have been participating in various missions since 1997, when the first unit was deployed to Albania for a humanitarian operation. Slovenia has continued its efforts in international cooperation by participating in various missions in Afghanistan, Iraq, Cyprus, Pakistan and other countries. The total amount of sent personnel through Slovenias contribution to missions is more than 15,000, but some speculations are over 20,000 personnel.

Current operations

Current equipment

Ground force

The Slovenian Armed Forces sent a request for 14 Pandur EVO armoured vehicles in late 2019. As the SAF already operate 85 Pandur I (Valuk), which is from the same family of vehicles and is the main vehicle of the army and were bought from the same company as the new ones which was Steyr (Austrian) in the past and today General Dynamics Land Systems (American), the company is offering the vehicles to the army as they know it will have all requirements for the SAF that the old ones lacked which is troop space, protection, modern electronics and RCWS. Unlike the Austrian Pandur EVO, which is only armed with 12.7mm M2 Browning HMG, some Slovenian Pandur EVO will be equipped with 40mm Heckler & Koch GMG. The Austrian government is offering a government to government contract with the Slovenian government to make the purchase cheaper. The director of GDELS confirmed there will be no corruption or problems with the purchase as they have done purchases in the past with no problem, as the SAF is an important customer to them. The 14 vehicles will fulfil 1 company of troops and the cost is estimated around 40 million Euros. The purchase is currently on standby as they are waiting for the decision of the new government for the purchase. Delivery to take place between 2020 and 2021.

Since the new defence minister wanted and still wants to finish the purchase of Boxer (armoured fighting vehicle) and the new general also being interested in it, if they solve the pricing problems it is possible that they will buy 56 Boxer vehicles instead of 14 Pandur EVO.

Alongside the 14 Pandur EVO armoured vehicles, they will be joined by 38 Joint Light Tactical Vehicle which the delivery date was said to be in 2021-2023 but has changed as productions etc. is going better than expected and therefor already being 12 Joint Light Tactical Vehicles in the army in 2020 which are intended to replace the Humvee. The cost for the purchase was 46,5 million Euros. They will be armed with 12.7mm M2 Browning HMG and some with 40mm Heckler & Koch GMG, 1 company being an anti-tank company equipped with Spike (ATGM) LR/MR missiles.

The ministry of defence of RS said in 2020 that the artillery will be equipped with self propelled howitzers which will increase its firepower, speed and efficiency. The German Panzerhaubitze 2000 is a high contender in this purchase which will be done after the purchase of the Pandur EVO armoured vehicles in 2022–2023.

As Slovenian ground force already has 11 Roland (missile) II short range air defences, the ministry of defence of RS said that they will make a purchase of an short to medium range air defence system with integrated radar which reduce the need for trucks to tow a radar for the air defence system. Purchase will be done in around 2024.

In May 2022, Slovenia signed a contract for the delivery of 45 Boxer (armoured fighting vehicle) in four different variants,with the contract being worth €281.5 Million and delivery of the vehicles expected to begin from 2024 until 2026.

Air
The Ministry of Defence stated that it will retire some aircraft to lower maintenance costs, while purchasing large transport aircraft. The purchase was completed in 2007 between the Italian Alenia C-27J Spartan and Spanish EADS CASA C-295. Both were tested in Cerklje ob Krki Airport military airport by the Slovenian pilots and the decision was made to buy the Spanish C-295, but one crashed and the purchase was cancelled.

Slovenian airspace is secured by NATO with NATO AIR POLICING. For NATO nations that do not have the necessary air capabilities (Albania, Estonia, Iceland, Luxembourg, Montenegro, Latvia, Lithuania, and Slovenia), agreements exist to ensure airspace security within SACEUR's area of responsibility. NATO Air Policing is a peacetime collective defence mission, which is at the very heart of NATO's founding treaty. It ensures the integrity of Allies' airspace and protects Alliance nations by maintaining continuous a 24/7 Air Policing within Supreme Allied Commander Europe's (SACEUR's) area of responsibility.

Aircraft:
 Pilatus PC-9M »Hudournik«
 Pilatus PC-9
 Pilatus PC-6 Turbo Porter
 Turbolet L-410
 Zlin Z-143
 Zlin Z-242
 Bell 206
 Bell 412
 Eurocopter AS532 Cougar

Navy

The navy will receive 2 underwater vessels 1 being remote controlled and 1 man operated.
Ships:NH90 helicopters may possibly be delivered
 Patrol ship Triglav
 Patrol boat Ankaran

Equipment purchase

Gallery

References

Further reading
 Furlan, Branimir (2013). "Civilian Control and Military Effectiveness: Slovenian Case," Armed Forces & Society 39, No. 3, pp. 434–449.

External links

 NATO Air Policing in Slovenian Air space and Slovenian air capabilities
 Official page 
 Slovenian Ministry of Defence official site 
 Slovenian Air Force
 Slovenian Armed Forces/Slovenska vojska

 
 
 
Organizations based in Ljubljana
1991 establishments in Slovenia
Permanent Structured Cooperation